Sithivinayagar Hindu College is a national school in Mannar, Sri Lanka.

See also
 List of schools in Northern Province, Sri Lanka

References

National schools in Sri Lanka
Buildings and structures in Mannar, Sri Lanka
Schools in Mannar District